Governor Foot or Foote may refer to:

Henry S. Foote (1804–1880), 19th Governor of Mississippi
Hugh Foot, Baron Caradon (1907–1990), Governor of Jamaica from 1951 to 1957, and Governor of Cyprus from 1957 to 1960
Samuel A. Foot (1780–1846), 28th Governor of Connecticut